Alniphyllum eberhardtii is a species of flowering plant in the family Styracaceae. It is found in southernmost China (southern Guangxi and southeast Yunnan), Thailand, and Vietnam.

It is a deciduous tree growing to 30 m tall. The leaves are alternate, simple, 10–18 cm long and 5–8 cm broad, oblong-lanceolate, with a serrated margin.

References

Styracaceae
Least concern plants
Trees of Thailand
Trees of Vietnam
Trees of China
Taxonomy articles created by Polbot